Bayou Gulch is one of the tributaries of Cherry Creek, located mainly in the U.S. state of Colorado. It is part of the Colorado Eastern Plains.  An archaeologically sensitive portion of the gulch was listed on the National Register of Historic Places in 2020.

Description

The gulch flows west through Eastern Douglas County and into Cherry Creek. Bayou Gulch Road follows the streambed, which is generally dry.

Recreational opportunities
There is a park that is next to the gulch with a playground basketball hoops, football field, baseball field, and hiking trails.

See also
List of rivers of Colorado

References

External links
Antero Reservoir
Chatfield Reservoir
Cheesman Reservoir
USGS: South Platte River Basin
University of Colorado: GIS Hydro Data for the South Platte
 City of Denver: South Platte Initiative
Eleven Mile Reservoir
The Greenway Foundation
Spinney Mountain Reservoir
Strontia Springs Reservoir and Waterton Canyon

Rivers of Colorado
Rivers of Elbert County, Colorado
Tributaries of the Platte River
Rivers of Douglas County, Colorado
National Register of Historic Places in Douglas County, Colorado
Archaeological sites on the National Register of Historic Places in Colorado